Sheykh Sorkh ol Din-e Sofla (also Romanized as Sheykh Sorkh ol Dīn-e Soflá and Sheykh Sorkh od Dīn-e Soflá; also known as Sheykh Sharḩ ed Dīn) is a village in Howmeh Rural District, in the Central District of Gilan-e Gharb County, Kermanshah Province, Iran. At the 2006 census, its population was 146, in 28 families.

References 

Populated places in Gilan-e Gharb County